The Who Hits 50! is a compilation of singles by the English rock band The Who, released in 2014 by Polydor Records. The two-disc set contains every single released by the band in the United Kingdom, with the exceptions of: "A Legal Matter" and "La-La-La-Lies" from 1966; and "Long Live Rock" and the remake of "I'm One" from 1979. At the same time it also contains every single by the band released in the United States throughout their career, with the exceptions of: "The Real Me" from 1974; the reissue of "Substitute" from 1976; and "Long Live Rock" from 1979. A condensed single-disc standard edition appeared as well, both versions in conjunction with the band's 50th anniversary and associated tour of the same name. The album is notable for containing singles generally not included on other compilation albums, such as the band's Rolling Stones cover "The Last Time" done as an act of solidarity while Mick Jagger and Keith Richards were facing jail time, along with other lesser-known singles "Dogs" and "Call Me Lightning".

The first disc includes every song from the compilation Meaty Beaty Big and Bouncy with the exception "A Legal Matter", and the second disc includes "Be Lucky", a track released as a single in support of the compilation and recorded during 2014 sessions for a proposed new studio album. The song is the first new material released by The Who since their 2006 studio album Endless Wire.

The selections were remastered by Jon Astley, and the cover art and packaging reflects the band's association with the pop art of the 1960s. On the two-disc set, the liner notes incorrectly list Pete Townshend as the writer of the track "Trick of the Light" when it was in fact written by John Entwistle.

Track listing

Original release

Single disc standard edition

Personnel
Roger Daltrey – lead vocals, percussion, harmonica, rhythm guitar
John Entwistle – vocals, bass guitar, brass instruments, keyboards on disc one and disc two through "It's Hard" except "The Last Time"
Kenney Jones – drums, percussion on disc two "You Better You Bet" through "It's Hard"
Keith Moon – drums, percussion on disc one and disc two through "Trick of the Light"
Pete Townshend – vocals, six and twelve-string acoustic and electric guitars, keyboards, synthesizer, jews harp, harmonica, accordion, banjo; bass guitar on "The Last Time"

Additional musicians
Dave Arbus – violin on "Baba O'Riley
Rod Argent – piano on "Who Are You"
John "Rabbit" Bundrick – keyboards, backing vocals on "You Better You Bet," "Athena," "It's Hard," and "It's Not Enough"
Jolyon Dixon – acoustic guitar on "It's Not Enough"
Andy Fairweather-Low – backing vocals on "Who Are You"
Rachel Fuller – keyboards on "It's Not Enough"
Peter Huntington – drums on "It's Not Enough"
The Ivy League – backing vocals, handclaps, piano on "I Can't Explain"
Greg Lake – bass guitar on "Real Good Looking Boy"
Billy Nicholls – backing vocals on "Be Lucky"
Pino Palladino – bass guitar on "Be Lucky"
Jimmy Page – twelve-string rhythm guitar on "I Can't Explain"
Stuart Ross – bass guitar on "It's Not Enough"
Chris Stainton – piano on "5:15"
Zak Starkey – drums, percussion on "Real Good Looking Boy" and "Be Lucky"
Simon Townshend – guitars, keyboards, backing vocals on "Real Good Looking Boy" and "Be Lucky"
Mick Talbot – keyboards on "Be Lucky"

Design
Richard Evans – album cover design, art direction

Charts

Certifications

References

2014 compilation albums
The Who compilation albums
Polydor Records compilation albums
Geffen Records compilation albums